Boult may refer to:

Boult (surname)
Boult, Haute-Saône, a commune in the French region of Franche-Comté

See also
Boult-aux-Bois, a commune in the French region of Champagne-Ardenne
Boult-sur-Suippe, a commune in the French region of Champagne-Ardenne
Bolt (disambiguation)